Ajico was a band, formed as a side project by Japanese singer Ua, and Kenichi Asai of Blankey Jet City. In the summer of 1999 after supplying music for two of Ua's songs, Asai and Ua decided to create a music group, and Ajico was born.

Discography

Singles
 "Hadou" (22 November 2000)
 "Utsukushii Koto" (24 January 2001)
 "Pepin" (27 June 2001)

Albums
 Fukamidori (7 February 2001)
 Ajico Show (25 July 2001)

DVD
 Ajico Show (25 July 2001)

References

External links
 Ajico Official Website - By Victor Entertainment

Japanese alternative rock groups
Ua (singer)